Bergaki (also Romanized as Bergakī and Bargakī; also known as Barkakī) is a village in Sornabad Rural District, Hamaijan District, Sepidan County, Fars Province, Iran. At the 2006 census, its population was 73, in 16 families.

References 

Populated places in Sepidan County